Ebru Elhan (born 19 February 1982 in Kayseri) is a Turkish volleyball player. She plays as outside hitter.

Biography 
She played for the Turkey women's national volleyball team, at the 2003 Women's European Volleyball Championship.

She plays for club team Ereğli Belediyesi.

See also
 Turkish women in sports

References

External links
 Telekom Ankara Official Website Profile

1982 births
Living people
People from Kayseri
Turkish women's volleyball players
VakıfBank S.K. volleyballers
Türk Telekom volleyballers
Galatasaray S.K. (women's volleyball) players
21st-century Turkish sportswomen